Urania brasiliensis is a day-flying moth of the family Uraniidae first described by William John Swainson in 1833.

Distribution
Urania brasiliensis is found in the Atlantic forest of Brazil. It is one of the two species of genus Urania found in that country.

References

External links

Uraniidae - Yale University

Uraniidae
Moths described in 1833